Williams Lake is an alpine lake in Taos County, New Mexico, United States, located high in the Sangre de Cristo Mountains below Wheeler Peak in the Wheeler Peak Wilderness of Carson National Forest.  The lake is accessible via the Williams Lake Trail from the trailhead in Taos Ski Valley.  The name is in reference to William Frazer, a gold miner who staked claims in the area and co-founded the mining camp of Twining during the late 1800s.

References

Lakes of New Mexico
Glacial lakes of the United States
Bodies of water of Taos County, New Mexico
Carson National Forest
Sangre de Cristo Mountains